Mohammad Irfan Fazil (born 2 November 1981) is a Pakistani former cricketer. He is a right-handed batsman and a right-arm medium-fast bowler. He has played in one Test match, and in the 2004/05 season he switched to Twenty20 cricket.

References

External links
 

1981 births
Living people
Pakistan One Day International cricketers
Pakistan Test cricketers
Pakistani cricketers
Lahore City cricketers
Pakistan National Shipping Corporation cricketers
Lahore Whites cricketers
Habib Bank Limited cricketers
Lahore cricketers
Lahore Blues cricketers
Lahore Eagles cricketers
Cricketers from Lahore